Dwight Isbell was a radio engineer, IEEE antennas and propagation fellow, and co-inventor of the Log-periodic antenna while a student at the University of Illinois under Raymond DuHamel. The log periodic antenna made possible broadband reception of color television signals. He is notable  for the invention of antenna, and the resulting lawsuits regarding the antenna.

The invention of the antenna and the patents were widely ignored by Channel Master and Blonder-Tongue, and resulted in the precedent setting Blonder-Tongue doctrine of "judicial economy", which bars defendants of patents from that have been previously ruled invalid (changing the Triplett v. Lowe precedent).

References 

1929 births
2011 deaths
American engineers
American inventors
People from Seattle